Turkey's climate is varied and generally temperate, with the regions bordering the Mediterranean and Black Sea heavily affected by the coasts, with the interior being drier and more mountainous. The dry-summer climate makes the country vulnerable to climate change.

By region

Aegean and Mediterranean 
The coastal areas of Turkey bordering the Aegean Sea and the Mediterranean Sea have a hot-summer Mediterranean climate, with hot, dry summers and mild to cool, wet winters.

Black Sea 
The coastal areas of Turkey bordering the Black Sea have a temperate Oceanic climate with warm, wet summers and cool to cold, wet winters. The Turkish Black Sea coast receives the most precipitation and is the only region of Turkey that receives high precipitation throughout the year. The eastern part of that coast averages 2,500 millimeters annually which is the highest precipitation in the country. The coastal areas of Turkey bordering the Sea of Marmara (including Istanbul), which connects the Aegean Sea and the Black Sea, have a transitional climate between a temperate Mediterranean climate and a temperate Oceanic climate with warm to hot, moderately dry summers and cool to cold, wet winters. Snow does occur on the coastal areas of the Sea of Marmara and the Black Sea almost every winter, but it usually lies no more than a few days. On the other hand, it is rare in the coastal areas of the Aegean Sea and very rare in the coastal areas of the Mediterranean Sea.

Interior plateaus 
Conditions can be much harsher in the more arid interior. Mountains close to the coast prevent maritime influences from extending inland, giving the central Anatolian plateau of the interior of Turkey a humid continental climate with sharply contrasting seasons.

Winters on the plateau are especially severe. Temperatures of −30 °C to −40 °C (−22 °F to −40 °F) do occur in northeastern Anatolia, and snow may lie on the ground at least 120 days of the year and in the mountains almost the entire year. In central Anatolia the temperatures can drop below -20 °C (-4 °F), with higher elevated parts dropping below -30 °C (- 22 °F) at times. Summers are hot and dry, with temperatures generally around or above 30 °C (86 °F) in the day. Nights are cool. Annual precipitation averages about 400 millimetres (15 in), with actual amounts determined by elevation. The driest regions are the Konya Plain and the Malatya Plain, where annual rainfall frequently is less than 300 millimetres (12 in). May is generally the wettest month, whereas July and August are the driest.

Climatic charts 
Below are the climates from the seven census regions of Turkey, showing how varied they can be in different places around the country:

National data

Climate change

See also 
 Climate change in Turkey
 Geography of Turkey
 Environmental issues in Turkey

References and notes 

 
Turkey